Riehen Niederholz railway station is a railway station in the municipality of Riehen, in the Swiss canton of Basel-Stadt. It is located on the standard gauge Wiese Valley Railway of Deutsche Bahn.

Services
 the following services stop at Riehen Niederholz:

References

External links

Railway stations in Basel-Stadt
Railway stations in Switzerland opened in 2008